Charles Robert Coyle (born March 2, 1992) is an American professional ice hockey forward currently playing for the Boston Bruins of the National Hockey League (NHL). He has also played for the Minnesota Wild.

Coyle played part of a single season with the Saint John Sea Dogs of the Quebec Major Junior Hockey League (QMJHL) in 2012. He played for the Boston University Terriers hockey program before he was drafted by the San Jose Sharks in the first round, 28th overall, of the 2010 NHL Entry Draft. In 2011, he was traded to the Minnesota Wild, with whom he played the first six years of his professional career before he was traded to the Bruins in 2019.

Playing career

Amateur
A native of Massachusetts, Coyle played for Weymouth High School, a public school, during his freshman year and helped the Wildcat varsity hockey team to their first-ever Super 8 finals appearance, in which they played at the TD Garden against Boston College High School, a private school. The Wildcats beat notable private schools during the playoffs during their stunning run, eliminating schools such as Malden Catholic High School, Austin Preparatory School and Central Catholic High School. He played for Thayer Academy in Braintree before finishing his senior season back with the Wildcats.

Coyle played Tier III Junior A ice hockey in the Eastern Junior Hockey League (EJHL) with the South Shore Kings, based in Foxboro. In the first and only season with South Shore, he finished fifth overall in scoring with 63 points in 42 games.

Coyle committed to play NCAA Division I college ice hockey with the Boston University Terriers of the Hockey East for the 2010–11 season. In his first game for the Terriers (an exhibition game against the University of Toronto), he scored two assists. He went on to record 26 points in 37 regular season games for the Terriers.

On December 16, 2011, Coyle made the decision to leave Boston University and sign with the Saint John Sea Dogs of the Quebec Major Junior Hockey League (QMJHL).

Professional

Minnesota Wild
Coyle was drafted by the San Jose Sharks in the first round of the 2010 NHL Entry Draft. On June 25, 2011, he was traded (along with Devin Setoguchi) to the Minnesota Wild in exchange for Brent Burns and second-round pick in the 2012 NHL Entry Draft and a first-round pick in the 2011 Draft.

On March 1, 2012, Coyle signed a three-year, entry-level contract with the Wild, with the team keeping him in the QMJHL with the Saint John Sea Dogs until the end of the 2011–12 season.

Coyle made his NHL debut on February 4, 2013. Wearing number 63, Charlie skated 12:44, with two shots and a hit. Coyle scored his first NHL goal (and point) against Joey MacDonald of the Calgary Flames on February 23, 2013. Coyle scored a memorable goal against the Los Angeles Kings on March 30, 2013—while shooting a one-timer, Coyle got taken down to his knees, received his own rebound, then buried a backhand shot for his eighth goal of the season. Coyle also got into his first NHL fight against the Columbus Blue Jackets, taking on Brandon Dubinsky. He was given a match penalty for a hit on Artem Anisimov, which sparked the fight. After further review from the NHL, he was not given any additional discipline.

Coyle switched his jersey number from 63 to 3, the same number he wore in college and in the QMJHL.

Charlie made headlines after making a fan named Henry's dreams come true after waving to the boy during warm-ups. The gesture and Henry's reaction to the gesture were put on YouTube and it went viral. Charlie met Henry and his family a few weeks later, a day before a game between the Wild and the St. Louis Blues.

In the 2015–16 season, Coyle was second on the team in goals scored, behind veteran Zach Parise. He set personal bests in goals, assists and points, breaking the 20-goal plateau for the first time in his career.

Early in the 2017–18 season, Coyle was placed on long term injury reserve after breaking his leg in a game against the Chicago Blackhawks. This ended his franchise-record game streak of 316 consecutive games. He returned to the Wild's lineup on November 20, 2017, after missing 16 games. In a game against the New York Rangers on February 13, 2018, a puck caught him high on the mouth, requiring stitches to close it. He required more stitches later on in the season against the Arizona Coyotes when a stick caught him in the mouth.

Boston Bruins

On February 20, 2019, Coyle was traded to the Boston Bruins in exchange for Ryan Donato and a fifth-round pick in the 2019 NHL Entry Draft. Although Coyle initially struggled with the Bruins, totaling 2 goals and 4 assists playing 21 regular season games, he was able to find consistency in time for the 2019 playoffs, centering the Bruins' third line now wearing lucky number 13 along with Marcus Johansson and Danton Heinen, scoring 9 goals and 16 points in 24 games. The Bruins would advance to the 2019 Stanley Cup Finals, ultimately losing to the St. Louis Blues in seven games. He finished the playoffs with nine goals and seven assists. 

On February 1, 2020, in his return to Minnesota with the Bruins, Coyle was named one of the Alternate Captains of the Bruins. On April 6, 2021, Coyle signed a six year, $31.5 million contract extension with the Bruins.

Personal

Coyle is the cousin of two former NHL players: Tony Amonte and Bobby Sheehan. He is close friends with former Wild teammate and current Pittsburgh Penguins left winger Jason Zucker.

In 2021 Coyle proposed to his long time girlfriend Danielle Hooper former Miss Minnesota USA 2013.

Career statistics

Regular season and playoffs

International

Awards and honors

References

External links

1992 births
Living people
American men's ice hockey centers
Boston Bruins players
Boston University Terriers men's ice hockey players
Houston Aeros (1994–2013) players
Ice hockey players from Massachusetts
Minnesota Wild players
National Hockey League first-round draft picks
Saint John Sea Dogs players
San Jose Sharks draft picks
Sportspeople from Weymouth, Massachusetts
Thayer Academy alumni